Frederic Wüstner (born 7 September 1992) is an Austrian handball player for TSV St. Otmar St. Gallen and the Austrian national team.

He represented Austria at the 2019 World Men's Handball Championship.

References

External links

1992 births
Living people
Austrian male handball players
People from Bregenz
Sportspeople from Vorarlberg